Bybee is an unincorporated community in Cocke County, Tennessee, United States. Its ZIP code is 37713.

Notes

Unincorporated communities in Cocke County, Tennessee
Unincorporated communities in Tennessee